Māris Bērziņš (born 1962) is a Latvian writer and playwright.

Māris Bērziņš has a professional background as a civil servant and his first book was published in 2003. He has written short stories and novels. In 2015, he was awarded the Baltic Assembly Prize for Literature.

References

1962 births
Living people
21st-century Latvian writers
University of Latvia alumni